WHAW is a Classic Country formatted broadcast radio station licensed to Lost Creek, West Virginia, serving Weston and Lewis County, West Virginia. WHAW is owned and operated by Della Jane Woofter.

Programming
The station derives its programming from Real Country from Cumulus Media.

History
The original owner was the Lewis Service Corporation, whose principal was Harold A. McWhorter.  Harold established WPAR Parkersburg in 1935, and WHAW Weston in 1948.  Harold wanted his initials as the call letters, WHAM, but Stromberg Carlson had those on 1180 in Rochester.  He chose WHAW, telling some they stood for "Harold and (his wife) Wilda," others that he had just turned over the "M" in McWhorter.

On February 14, 2008, WHAW changed their format from oldies to bluegrass.

On April 1, 2010, WHAW changed their format from bluegrass to classic country.

References

External links
WHAW 980 AM Online

HAW
Country radio stations in the United States
Radio stations established in 1948